"Can U Believe" is the third single from Robin Thicke's second studio album The Evolution of Robin Thicke. It was released to Urban AC radio on April 12, 2007. Originally "Got 2 Be Down" was expected to be the 3rd single but due to Faith Evans' pregnancy the plans for the release of the single were scrapped even though the song had already begun receiving airplay. "Got 2 Be Down" was later released as the album's fourth single.

Chart performance
The single, to date, has peaked at number fifteen on Billboard'''s Hot R&B/Hip-Hop Singles & Tracks. It debuted on the Billboard Hot 100 at number one hundred in the chart week of August 18. In September 2007, the song re-entered the Billboard Hot 100 at #99.
"Can U Believe" peaked at number twelve on the Hit Las Vegas R&B chart in May 2007.

Music video
The video appeared on 106 and Park'' on May 9, 2007, as "The New Joint of the Day" on BET. It was directed by Benny Boom.

References

2007 singles
Robin Thicke songs
Music videos directed by Benny Boom
Songs written by Robin Thicke
Contemporary R&B ballads
2005 songs
2000s ballads